The Renaissance Palace is the official residence of the President of the Central African Republic, located in the 1st arrondissement of Bangui (:fr:1er arrondissement de Bangui), at the foot of Gbazabangui Hill and facing the PK zéro.

History 
The original building with verandas was built in French Colonial style from 1917 to 1920 by Victor Henri Sisson.

The palace was the residence of the Governor of Ubangi-Shari until 1960, when the country gained independence from France and the palace became the seat of the President of the Republic.

The palace was reconstructed during the rule of Jean-Bédel Bokassa (1966–1979).  During the final three years of Bokassa’s rule, the leader served as the Emperor of Central Africa and the Renaissance Palace served as the imperial palace.

References 

Buildings and structures in Bangui
Houses completed in 1920
Presidential residences
Government buildings completed in 1920